The Dr. John Quincy Howe House is a notable house located in Phelps, New York.  Listed on the National Register of Historic Places, the house is thought to be the only house in the state of New York with a two-story privy and the only house in the United States with a two-story brick privy.

The house is owned by the Phelps Community Historical Society and is operated as a museum.

History
It was built in 1869 by Moses Barlow on the site of a former tavern, and is a -story, Second Empire style brick dwelling with a slate mansard roof. The house has several asymmetrically placed side and rear wings. It features a two-story six-hole (three up, three down) privy thought to be the only house with such a structure.  Access to the unique feature can be obtained from both levels of the house.

It was listed on the National Register of Historic Places in 2001.

The house was purchased by an anonymous donor in 1999 and presented as a gift to the Phelps Community Historical Society.  The house has been renovated and is now open to the public for tours.

References

 Doris, Spink. Phelps Community Historical Society. .  Accessed September 13, 2006.

External links
Phelps Community Historical Society
Preservation of the Howe House

Historic house museums in New York (state)
Historical society museums in New York (state)
Houses in Ontario County, New York
Houses on the National Register of Historic Places in New York (state)
Second Empire architecture in New York (state)
Houses completed in 1869
Museums in Ontario County, New York
Phelps, New York
1869 establishments in New York (state)
National Register of Historic Places in Ontario County, New York